The Junior Officers' Reading Club: Killing Time and Fighting Wars is a 2009 book by Patrick Hennessey, a former officer in the Grenadier Guards.

It charts his military career, from training at Sandhurst through several campaigns including Iraq and Afghanistan. The book received positive reviews for its account of the realities of modern soldiering and warfare.

The book was serialised as the Book of the Week on BBC Radio 4 in June 2009. A sequel, Kandak, was written by Hennessey in 2012.

Reading list
A version of the book published by Penguin Books with a new Afterword in 2010 details the books that were read in "The Junior Officers' Reading Club".  The list is as follows:

References

British autobiographies
British non-fiction books
Grenadier Guards
War on Terror books
2009 non-fiction books